The 1904 United States presidential election in Minnesota took place on November 8, 1904. All contemporary 45 states were part of the 1904 United States presidential election. Minnesota voters chose 11 electors to the Electoral College, which selected the president and vice president.

Minnesota was won by the Republican nominees, incumbent President Theodore Roosevelt of New York and his running mate Charles W. Fairbanks of Indiana. The ticket won the state by a margin of 55.14 points.

Roosevelt carried all of Minnesota's counties, becoming the first presidential candidate to do so. The only other presidential candidate to sweep all of the state's counties has been Warren G. Harding in 1920. In addition, with 73.98 percent of the popular vote, Minnesota would be Roosevelt's third strongest victory in terms of percentage in the popular vote after Vermont and North Dakota. Roosevelt’s 73.98 percent constitutes the best performance by any presidential candidate since Minnesota’s statehood in 1858.

Results

Results by county

Notes

References

Minnesota
1904
1904 Minnesota elections